Escape from Singapore is a 1973 Australian TV dramatised documentary about General Gordon Bennett and his escape from Singapore in World War II.

It was a number of dramatised documentaries Power made for Australian TV. He spent ten months researching it, accessing papers provided by Bennett's widow. It won Best Documentary at the 1974 TV Week Logie Awards.

References

External links

1973 television films
1973 films
Australian documentary television films
1970s English-language films
Films directed by John Power